Columella is a genus of very small, air-breathing land snails, terrestrial pulmonate gastropod mollusks in the family Truncatellinidae, the whorl snails and allies.

Taxonomy
Columella is commonly classified within the Vertiginidae. However, as shown by Nekola & Coles (2016), the genus is not that closely related to the Vertiginidae, but may rather be affiliated with the Chondrinidae or form a pupilloid family of its own. A systematic revision is pending.

Species
Species within the genus Columella include:
 Columella acicularis Almuhambetova, 1979
 Columella aspera Waldén, 1966
 Columella columella (G. v. Martens, 1830)
 Columella edentula (Draparnaud, 1805) - toothless column
 Columella hartmutnordsiecki Schlickum & Geissert, 1980 
 Columella hasta (Hanna, 1911)
 Columella intermedia Schileyko & Almuhambetova, 1984
 Columella microspora (R.T. Lowe, 1852)
 Columella nymphaepratensis Hlaváč & Pokryszko, 2009
 Columella polvonense (Pilsbry, 1894)
 Columella simplex (Gould, 1840)
 Columella talgarica Schileyko & Rymzhanov, 2010
 Columella wyciski Schlickum & Strauch, 1972
Species brought into synonymy
 Columella inornata (Michaud, 1831): synonym of Columella edentula (Draparnaud, 1805) (junior synonym)
 Columella ninagongonis Pilsbry, 1935: synonym of Truncatellina ninagongonis (Pilsbry, 1935) (original combination)
 Columella tridentata A. B. Leonard, 1946: synonym of Gastrocopta ruidosensis (Cockerell, 1899)

References

Truncatellinidae